Spain competed at the 1954 European Athletics Championships in Bern, Switzerland, from 25 to 29 August 1954.

Results

Men
Track & road events

Field events

Nations at the 1954 European Athletics Championships
1954
European Athletics Championships